The Bishop Wheeler Catholic Academy Trust is a group of thirteen schools in the North West Leeds, Ilkley and North Yorkshire area that converted to Academies
since 2013. The trust is named after Gordon Wheeler, the seventh Roman Catholic Bishop of Leeds from 1966 until 1985.

Member schools
The Bishop Wheeler Academy Trust has 13 member schools:

The proposals by the Roman Catholic Diocese of Leeds state there are 4 other schools that could join the trust.

History
In March 2012, plans were announced for Catholic schools across the Leeds Diocese to investigate teaming up to form trust academies that would no longer be under local authority control. The Governing Bodies of St. Mary's Menston and four other schools considered a proposal of converting to Academy status in 2013 and forming together a Multi-Academy Trust. A consultation period occurred between September and October 2012. The academy conversion took place on 1 March 2013. The logo of the trust is Bishop Wheeler's Episcopal Coat of Arms. The first Chair of the Academy Trust Board was Caroline Hyde. The second Chair of the Academy Trust Board is Diane Gaskin.

References

External links
 Bishop Wheeler Catholic Academy Trust website
 Bishop Wheeler Catholic Academy Trust Twitter Account (verified)
 DfE Compare School and College Performance: The Bishop Wheeler Catholic Academy Trust

 
Academy trusts